Ottman is a surname. Notable people with the surname include:

Ali Ottman (born 1987), Arab-Israeli footballer
Bill Ottman (born 1985), American Internet entrepreneur
Fred Ottman (born 1956), American wrestler
Jacquelyn Ottman (born 1955), American writer
John Ottman (born 1964), American film composer and editor
Kris Ottman Neville (1925–1980), American science fiction writer
Pepper Ottman, American politician

See also 
Ottman Corners, Wisconsin, is an unincorporated community located in the town of Trimbelle, Pierce County, Wisconsin, United States
Ottman-Murray Beach, is a hamlet in the Canadian province of Saskatchewan
Ottmann, surname